Albemarle County Public Schools (ACPS) is a school district serving Albemarle County, Virginia. Its headquarters are in the City of Charlottesville. ACPS serves approximately 14,000 students in preschool through grade 12 in Albemarle County, Virginia, the sixth largest county by area in the Commonwealth of Virginia. A diverse locality of 726 square miles in the heart of Central Virginia, Albemarle County is a blend of primarily rural, but also suburban and urban settings.

The current Superintendent, Dr. Matthew S. Haas, was appointed by the Albemarle County School Board in July 2018.

Schools

Academies and Lab Schools 

 Environmental Studies Academy (ESA)
 Health and Medical Sciences Academy (HMSA)
 Murray High School (Creative Arts, Media, and Design)
 Math, Engineering, Science Academy (MESA)
 Community Public Charter School ("Community Middle")

Comprehensive High Schools 

Albemarle
Monticello
Western Albemarle

Comprehensive Middle Schools 

Jackson P. Burley
Joseph T. Henley
Journey
Lakeside
Leslie H. Walton

Elementary schools 

Agnor-Hurt
Baker-Butler
Broadus Wood
Brownsville
Mountain View
Crozet
Mary C. Greer
Hollymead
Meriwether Lewis
Virginia L. Murray
Red Hill
Scottsville
Stone-Robinson
Stony Point
Woodbrook

Alternative, Regional, and Specialty Centers 

 Albemarle Tech
 CATEC (Charlottesville Albemarle Technical Education Center)
 Center 1
 Ivy Creek School
 PREP (Piedmont Regional Education Program)

Graduates 
2018 ACPS graduates received 1,078 acceptances from 204 colleges and universities, including 146 acceptances from 15 of the top 25 national universities, according to rankings by U.S. News & World Report.

Of the 1,070 graduates:

 617 (57.7%) reported plans to attend a 4-year college.
 255 (23.8%) reported plans to attend a 2-year college.
 198 (18.5%) reported alternate plans, including other continuing education, military, employment, or something else.

Other Data 
ACPS students were born in 89 countries and speak 74 home languages.

Average Class Size for 2017–18:

 Elementary – 19.4
 Middle – 22.1
 High – 21.4

Student-to-Computer Ratio: 1:1 for grades 3–12; 3:2 for grades K-2

Average number of meals served daily (including breakfast and lunch): 8,000

School bus miles traveled daily: 14,384

The Families in Crisis Program served approximately 457 homeless children in the 2017–18 school year, including 255 ACPS students and other children/students (siblings of ACPS students who are preschoolers or dropouts, and students living in Albemarle County who attend adjoining school systems).

Budget Snapshot

Operating Budget 
FY 18–19 (Adopted): $186,800,503

FY 17–18 (Adopted): $180,486,940

FY 16–17 (Actual): $171,085,922

Per Pupil Expenses 
FY 18–19 (Adopted): $13,635.07

FY 17–18 (Adopted): $13,418.11

FY 16–17 (Actual): $12,760.94

References

External links

 

School divisions in Virginia
Education in Albemarle County, Virginia
Government agencies with year of establishment missing